GroupSpaces (stylized in lowercase as groupspaces) was a London-based online company that provides technology to help real-world clubs, societies, associations and other groups manage their membership and activities, and promote themselves online. Founded by Oxford University students David Langer and Andy Young, the company was launched in the United Kingdom in 2007 and then since expanded into the United States and over 30 other countries.

The company has been inactive since 2013.

Revenue and funding 

GroupSpaces generates revenue via a combination of premium accounts, targeted advertising and transaction commission from payments made through the site. The company also generates revenue by allowing graduate recruiters to advertise their campus activities and promote their opportunities to a highly employable community of students throughout the whole academic year. Campaigns can be targeted to specific universities and audiences such as fraternities, hobbyists and entrepreneurial clubs.

Since 2007, GroupSpaces has worked with over 70 graduate recruiters including Allen & Overy, Clifford Chance, Slaughter & May, Freshfields, BCG, McKinsey & Company, Accenture, Deloitte, PwC, KPMG, Citi, JP Morgan, Barclays Capital, Morgan Stanley, Bank of England, Deutsche Bank, Credit Suisse, RBS, UBS, Lloyd's of London and the NHS. GroupSpaces also works with many of the leading recruitment agencies in the UK including Euro RSCG Riley, SAS Design, Thirty Three, TMP Worldwide, Stafford Long, Work Communications, Mediacom and City & Law.

The company raised a small amount of angel finance from Avonmore Developments in January 2008. In June 2010 it secured a $1.3 million (£860,000) investment round from Index Ventures and a leading angel investor consortium including Dave McClure, Chris Sacca, Simon Levene, Meagan Marks, Ariel Poler and Quincy Smith of CODE Advisors.  The previous backers, Stephen Bullock and Simon and Michael Blakey, of Avonmore Developments, also participated in the round.
The funding has been used to expand both the technical and marketing teams in both the United Kingdom and United States. In the first few months of operation in the United States, top schools such as Harvard, Yale, Princeton, MIT and Stanford signed on with GroupSpaces.

In April 2013 Andy Young walked away from Groupspaces and by July 2013 it had become a "ghost operation" with no customer support and no development. The UK Companies Registry started compulsory winding up against the company in April 2013, and although this was withdrawn, as of 3 November 2013 the company was again overdue with required filings.

Awards 

On April 13, 2011, GroupSpaces was named the winner of the Social Networking and Collaboration category of the Startup 100 awards.

Closure 
On January 2, 2021, GroupSpaces announced its closure with effect from April 2, 2021.

References

External links
 Official website

Online advertising services and affiliate networks
Digital marketing companies of the United Kingdom
Groupware
Companies based in London
Online companies of the United Kingdom